Ezel is a given name. Notable people with the name include:

 Ezel Akay, Turkish film actor, director and producer
 Ezel Bayraktar, fictional character protagonist of the Turkish TV series Ezel
 Ezel Kural Shaw, Turkish American writer, wife of historian Stanford J. Shaw

Turkish masculine given names
Turkish feminine given names